Marek Michalička (born 23 December 1986) is a professional Czech tennis player. 

On 6 June 2015 Michalička reached his career-high singles ranking of 235. On 23 June 2014 Michalička reached a career-high doubles ranking of 261. 

Michalička has won 10 singles and 11 doubles titles at ITF Futures Tour.

Career

He made his grand slam qualification debut at the 2012 US Open, losing to Roberto Bautista-Agut 3–6, 4–6.

He made his ATP World Tour debut at 2016 BNP Paribas Open in doubles competition partnering with Ivo Minář losing in the first round to Nenad Zimonjić and Edouard Roger-Vasselin 3–6, 7–6(8–6), [15–17] after failing to convert 4 match points.

Currently. he runs the Process Tennis Academy in Bloomfield Hills, Michigan.

External links
 
 

1986 births
Living people
Czech male tennis players
Tennis players from Prague